Fariha is a town and a nagar panchayat in Firozabad district  in the state of Uttar Pradesh, India.

References

Cities and towns in Firozabad district